Northsuite is a compilation released by the black metal band Velvet Cacoon. Contains both the "Red Steeples" demo from 2004 and the "Music For Falling Buildings" demo from 2003.

Release history
Original 2005 Ivory Snowfish Music printing limited to 100 Centurian "Of Purest Fire" Pro CD-Rs. Later re-released that year on CD by Full Moon.

LP version released by Southern Lord in June 2007 with a jacket made of velvet with the logo in black foil. Limited to 1500 copies, 500 being marble-purple.

Track listing

All songs written by Velvet Cacoon. Tracks 1-6 from the "Red Steeples" demo. Tracks 7-8 from the "Music For Falling Buildings" demo.

Personnel
 Josh (8) - vocals, guitar, drum programming
 Angela (4) - guitar 
 Dorothy Montoure - mixing

References

Velvet Cacoon albums
2005 albums
Southern Lord Records albums